On 26 June 1954, in a quarterfinal match of the 1954 FIFA World Cup, Austria beat Switzerland 7–5 in Lausanne, Switzerland. The 12 goals scored in the match set a World Cup record, unequalled to date, for the highest scoring match ever. The match is known by its German name, Hitzeschlacht von Lausanne (roughly translated to "The heat battle of Lausanne"), due to the high temperature that it was played under, 40 °C (104 °F).

Match chronicle
Switzerland, the tournament hosts, took a notable lead early on. In four minutes, the Swiss scored three goals: forward Robert Ballaman opened the score at the 16th minute, followed quickly by two goals by Josef Hügi. Austria then became the first team in World Cup history to recover from a 3–0 deficit, scoring 5 goals in the remainder of the first half; Theodor Wagner initiated the Austrian response at the 25th minute; forward Alfred Körner drew the score to 2–3 one minute later, and another minute later Wagner equalized to 3–3. Austria had tied the score in three minutes. In 11 minutes, between the 16th and the 27th minutes, six goals were scored, three by each team. At the 32nd minute, Ernst Ocwirk gave Austria the lead; Körner added his second, making the score 5–3. Ballaman scored again for Switzerland at the 39th minute. The first half thus ended 5–4 in favour of Austria, being the highest scoring half in World Cup history, even after inside left Körner had missed a penalty kick in the 42nd minute.

Nine minutes into the second half, Wagner put Austria up 6–4 with his third goal, recording the seventh hat-trick of the 1954 World Cup (See List of World Cup hat-tricks). Hügi would then emulate the feat, scoring his third at the 58th minute. Switzerland was not able to equalize, and Erich Probst made it 7–5 to end the scoring at the 76th minute. According to FIFA, the extreme heat adversely affected Switzerland after they led the match 3–0 at one point. Other sources add that at first, Switzerland had been able to take advantage of the temperature, when Austrian goalkeeper Kurt Schmied suffered from hyperthermia early in the match, quickly allowing the first three Swiss goals, before being assisted by the Austrian masseur while in play.

Match

Details

References and footnotes

1954 FIFA World Cup
Austria at the 1954 FIFA World Cup
1954
FIFA World Cup matches
June 1954 sports events in Europe
Nicknamed sporting events
Sport in Lausanne
Switzerland at the 1954 FIFA World Cup
1954